Psammobotys fordi is a moth in the family Crambidae. It was described by Eugene G. Munroe in 1961. It is found in North America, where it has been recorded from California.

References

Moths described in 1961
Odontiini